Arthur Gooch (January 4, 1909 – June 19, 1936) was an American criminal, who is notable for being the only person executed under the Federal Kidnapping Act who did not kill the victim(s).

Gooch was the only person sentenced to death and executed by the federal government of the United States for a kidnapping in which the victim(s) were not killed. Gooch and another man, Ambrose Nix, kidnapped police officers R.N. Baker and H.R. Marks in Texas on November 26, 1934, and released them in Oklahoma. Baker was badly injured after being shoved into a glass case, which then broke during the kidnapping. This made the crime a capital offense since the victims had not been released unharmed.

Nix was killed while resisting arrest on December 23, 1934.

Although the electric chair was the only method of execution in Oklahoma at this time, Gooch was executed by hanging. Like Gooch, another federal inmate James Alderman, executed in Florida on August 17, 1929, was also hanged, despite the fact that Florida state law authorized electrocution as a sole method.

The sentence was carried out by Oklahoma's state executioner, Rich Owens. According to the witnesses Gooch's hanging was botched and his death lasted 15 minutes. Many blamed Owens for this failure, as this was the only hanging he ever performed and the first hanging in Oklahoma since 1911.

His last words were reported to have been, "It's kind of funny—dying. I think I know what it will be like. I'll be standing there, and all of a sudden everything will be black, then there'll be a light again. There's got to be a light again—there's got to be."

Gooch was 26 years old at time of his execution.

See also 

 Capital punishment by the United States federal government
 List of people executed by the United States federal government

Notes and references

1936 deaths
People executed by the United States federal government by hanging
20th-century executions of American people
People executed under the Federal Kidnapping Act
Kidnappings in the United States
1909 births